The 1958 Argentine Grand Prix was a Formula One motor race held on 19 January 1958 at Autodromo Municipal Ciudad de Buenos Aires Circuit. It was race 1 of 11 in the 1958 World Championship of Drivers and race 1 of 10 in the 1958 International Cup for Formula One Manufacturers. The race was the sixth Argentine Grand Prix. It was held on the #2 variation of the circuit. The race was held over 80 laps of the four kilometre circuit for a total race distance of 313 kilometres.

The race was won by British driver Stirling Moss in Rob Walker's privately entered Cooper T43. Apart from being the first World Drivers Championship race win for Cooper as a constructor it was also the first win for a rear-engined car, the first win for a car entered by a privateer team and the first win for a car powered by an engine built by another manufacturer. Moss took his seventh Grand Prix victory by 2.7 seconds over Italian driver Luigi Musso (Ferrari 246 F1). Musso's British teammate Mike Hawthorn (Ferrari 246 F1) was third.

Report
A change in fuel regulations meant that the British teams Vanwall and BRM would not be ready for the Argentine race held in mid-January, four months ahead of the second race of the season in Monaco. This meant that this race had the fewest entries (10) of any Grand Prix in the history of the F1 World Championship. Vanwall released Moss to compete with another team and he linked up with the Rob Walker Racing Team to drive their Cooper T43, a car about to be superseded at the factory Cooper team by the new T45.

With the race set to be held in very hot conditions the race was shortened from 400 kilometres to 313. The shorter race led the Walker team to consider running the race without stopping for tyres.  The car's four stud wheels would take almost two laps to complete a tyre change, much slower than their Ferrari and Maserati rivals. Moss and his team began a deception, complaining about the tyre situation and how much time they would lose changing tyres.

Jean Behra in a privateer Maserati 250F led at the start but was quickly passed by Hawthorn. By lap ten Juan Manuel Fangio had taken the lead in the Scuderia Sud Americana entered Maserati 250F and Moss had worked his way forward into second position as the pitstops began for the heavier Italian built cars.

After the pitstops Moss led from Musso and Hawthorn. Behra was delayed by a spin and Fangio by a misfire. With ten laps remaining the others decided Moss was not going to pit and Musso and Hawthorn picked up the pace. Moss' tyres were disintegrating but there was enough with careful driving that Moss limped to the line for a remarkable victory. Behind the two Ferraris Fangio was the first Maserati to finish with Behra, two laps down, scoring the remaining points. Harry Schell was next ahead of Fangio's teammate Carlos Menditeguy, both Maserati 250F mounted. Peter Collins was the only retirement of the ten entries having stopped on the opening lap with a broken axle in the third Ferrari.

It was the first victory for a rear-engined car but for the moment it would be an aberration brought on by tactics. It was not yet obvious that the death of the front-engined car was just a year away.

Classification

Qualifying

Race

Notes
 – Includes 1 point for fastest lap

Championship standings after the race

Drivers' Championship standings

Constructors' Championship standings

 Note: Only the top five positions are included for both sets of standings.

References

Argentine Grand Prix
Argentine Grand Prix
Argentine Grand Prix
Argentine Grand Prix